Eight Elvises is a 1963 silkscreen painting by American pop artist Andy Warhol of Elvis Presley. In 2008, it was sold by Annibale Berlingieri for $100 million to a private buyer, which at the time was the most valuable work by Andy Warhol. The current owner and location of the painting, which has not been seen publicly since the 1960s, are unknown.

Background
Eight Elvises is composed of eight identical, overlapping images of Elvis Presley in cowboy attire, silkscreened over a silver background. The painting was originally a portion of a  piece, containing sixteen copies of Elvis, that was showcased in a 1963 exhibition at the Ferus Gallery in Los Angeles. The exhibition, Warhol's second at the Ferus, contained several other pieces using the same image of Elvis, as well as a series of head shots of Elizabeth Taylor. The images of Elvis were taken from a publicity still from the movie Flaming Star. While Warhol created 22 versions of the painting with two Elvises on it, known as Double Elvis, only one piece titled Eight Elvises was created.

2008 sale
In 2008, Eight Elvises was sold by Annibale Berlingieri, who had owned it for 40 years, in a private sale for $100 million to an unidentified collector. News of the sale, which was not announced publicly at the time, was broken by art writer Sarah Thornton and published in The Economist in late 2009. The deal was brokered by Philippe Ségalot, a New York-based art dealer and one time head of the contemporary art department at Christie's auction house. The sale made Eight Elvises one of the most expensive paintings ever sold, and made Warhol only the fifth artist, behind Pablo Picasso, Gustav Klimt, Jackson Pollock, and Willem de Kooning to have a painting sold for at least $100 million. The current location of the painting is unknown.

Another painting from 1963, Silver Car Crash (Double Disaster), broke the valuation record for a Warhol work set by Eight Elvises when it sold for $105.4 million at auction in November 2013.

See also
 Triple Elvis
 List of most expensive paintings
 List of all known Warhol Elvis silkscreens, their  current location, as well as prices met, when known

Notes

References
 

Paintings by Andy Warhol
1963 paintings
Cultural depictions of Elvis Presley
20th-century portraits